Agustín Humberto Cejas (born 1964, in Córdoba, Argentina) is an Argentine Army officer who serves as Chief of the Army General Staff.

Military career 
Agustín Cejas received his commission as a Military Officer at the Nation Military College in 1984.

Cejas has the following service record:

 4th Paratrooper Artillery Group.
 11th Artillery Group.
 Artillery School.
 Superior War School.
 Army General Staff.
 Chief of 10th Artillery Group.
 Director of Artillery School.
 Inspector of Artillery.
 Vice principal of Nation Military College.
 Principal of Nation Military College.
 Managing director of Education.
 Vice rector of National Defence University.

Chief of Army General Staff 
President Alberto Fernández ordered the change of the chief of the Army General Staff. Brigadier General Agustín H. Cejas was invested as the new chief of the General Staff of the Army by Decree 181/2020.

On 28 February 2020, Minister of Defence Agustín Rossi commissioned Cejas in a ceremony held in the 1st Infantry Regiment “Patricios”. The outgoing holder, Lieutenant General Claudio Pasqualini, was also honored.

References 

1964 births
Living people
Argentine generals